Sphegina distincta is a species of hoverfly in the family Syrphidae found in Vietnam. It vaguely resembles other Oriental species of Sphegina that have strong spinose setae at the posterior margin of sternum IV, but is not especially similar to any of them.

Etymology
The name comes from Latin ‘distincta’, meaning ‘different’, referring to the unusually extensive yellow color of the fly.

Description
In male specimens, body length is 8.4-9.9 millimeters. The wings are 5.8-6.5 millimeters, entirely microtrichose, hyaline, with yellowish stigma. The face is concave with a weakly developed frontal prominence; dark brown, ventral half light-brown to dark or entirely yellow.

References

Eristalinae
Insects described in 2018
Diptera of Asia